The 2015 Punta del Este ePrix (officially the 2015 FIA Formula E Julius Baer Punta del Este ePrix) was a Formula E motor race held on 19 December 2015 at the Punta del Este Street Circuit in Punta del Este, Uruguay. It was the second Punta del Este ePrix and the third championship race of the 2015–16 Formula E season, the second season of the single-seater, electrically powered racing car series. The race was won by Swiss driver Sébastien Buemi from team Renault .

Report

Background

For this year, the circuit was slightly modified. The first corner was changed, instead of a right-left chicane it is now left-right. The idea behind this change is to make the pit exit much safer than last year, where the cars were exiting the pits on the racing line.

Mahindra driver Nick Heidfeld missed the event, after undergoing surgery to repair ligament damage in his wrist after a crash at the previous race in Putrajaya. He was replaced by Formula Renault 3.5 champion Oliver Rowland, from Great Britain.

Team Trulli withdrew from the championship after failing to enter their new drivetrain for the first two events. Therefore, only 18 drivers participated in this race and also for the rest of the season.

Venturi driver Jacques Villeneuve crashed in qualifying. His team was unable to repair the damage in time for race day, and the Canadian was subsequently withdrawn.

Classifications

Qualifying 

Notes:

  – Final grid position of top five qualifiers determined by Super Pole shootout.

Super Pole

Race 

Notes:
 – Two points for fastest lap.
 – Three points for pole position.
 – Jacques Villeneuve did not start the race due to the heavy accident during Friday's qualifying session, he had to withdraw.

Standings after the race

Drivers' Championship standings

Teams' Championship standings

 Notes: Only the top five positions are included for both sets of standings.

References

External links

|- style="text-align:center"
|width="35%"|Previous race:2015 Putrajaya ePrix
|width="30%"|FIA Formula E Championship2015–16 season
|width="35%"|Next race:2016 Buenos Aires ePrix
|- style="text-align:center"
|width="35%"|Previous race:2014 Punta del Este ePrix
|width="30%"|Punta del Este ePrix
|width="35%"|Next race:2018 Punta del Este ePrix
|- style="text-align:center"

Punta del Este ePrix
Punta del Este ePrix
Punta del Este ePrix
Articles containing video clips